Grant David Hayunga, (born June 23, 1970) is an American painter and musician of Frisian descent.

Early life and family 
Grant is the son of Del Hayunga, a businessman, and Jean Meyer Hayunga, a public health nurse and home maker. His brother, Blake Hayunga, is a real estate manager/developer in San Francisco.
Hayunga's parents moved to [New York City] in 1970 to embark on their careers and soon moved to New Jersey, then Minnesota, where Hayunga attended St. Paul Academy. The family moved to Louisville, Kentucky in the mid-1980s, where he attended Ballard High School and first assembled his band, Goshen. Since the first lineup, Goshen has had a revolving cast, with the exception of the current band including Hayunga, Elizabeth DeCicco, Jim Palmer on drums and Jason Reed on bass.

Early career

Hayunga attended the Rhode Island School of Design (RISD) on a merit scholarship in Providence, Rhode Island. Selling paintings before he graduated, he moved to Santa Fe, New Mexico, where he joined Linda Durham Contemporary Art. His first solo show with Linda Durham was in 1993. His next solo show was at Gallery De Praktijk in Amsterdam, entitled "The Red Peyote Papers".

By 2006 Hayunga was working on his sixth album, Lioness, with the Palmer brothers in Santa Fe. The cover features Hayunga's piece "Lioness" from The Red Peyote Series.

Mid career
Hayunga's 2008 solo show with Linda Durham Contemporary Art was entitled Tree Skeletons. This was an evolution of his earlier series, Ojo de la Tierra, and his final show with the gallery. After two decades, Hayunga moved on from Linda Durham Contemporary Art to LAUNCHPROJECTS with Cyndi Conn and Ben Lincoln.

After the release of Lioness, Hayunga embarked on a new project that was to be released in 2009, The Como Sessions: Volume 1. The new album was produced by James "Jimbo" Mathus of the Squirrel Nut Zippers, Buddy Guy and Knockdown South. It was recorded at Delta Recording Service in Como, Mississippi on November 11, 2008. With the exception of Elizabeth DeCicco on vocals, Hayunga used musicians from The Hill Country including Jimbo Mathus (guitar, piano, Wurlitzer organ, mandolin, drums, percussion and vocals), Corey Jenkins (drums), Justin Showah (engineer and bass) of Afrissippi and Chad Smith (Wurlitzer organ).

In 2000, Grant met actress/singer/model Elizabeth DeCicco when they were both at a taping of Saturday Night Live with friend Val Kilmer hosting and U2 as musical guest. Their relationship began in 2006, six years after they had met. By 2008, they were performing together in Goshen. They currently reside in Santa Fe.

External links
  – Hayunga painting site
  – Grant Hayunga with LAUNCHPROJECTS
  – American Art Collector magazine includes review of Grant Hayunga's Tree Skeletons show
  – KNME (PBS) profile of Grant Hayunga
  – KNME (PBS) profile of Grant Hayunga on YouTube
  – Hayunga in NY and San Francisco shows
  – Santa Fe Reporter review of Hayunga's "Red Peyote" exhibit
  – Santa Fe Reporter review of Hayunga's "Tree Skeletons" exhibit
  – Mescalina in Italy correlating Hayunga's paintings with his music
  – Hayunga painting site
 
  – Hayunga listed as De Praktijk artist
  – Hayunga exhibit announcement for De Praktijk in Amsterdam
  – Grant Hayunga Painting MySpace
  – Goshen's Myspace
  – Frogville Records Goshen page
  – CD Baby
  – Goshen review
  – Goshen review-mentions Val Kilmer producing "From Bedlam To Ballyhoo"
  – Linda Durham Contemporary Art featuring images of a selection from Hayunga's work
  – Val Kilmer mentions Goshen in what he's listening to
  – Goshen schedule at North Mississippi Hill Country Picnic

20th-century American painters
American male painters
21st-century American painters
Modern painters
American male singer-songwriters
American singer-songwriters
Living people
1970 births
21st-century American singers
21st-century American male singers
20th-century American male artists